Ohrazenice refers to the following places in the Czech Republic:

 Ohrazenice (Příbram District)
 Ohrazenice (Semily District)